"Monto (Take Her Up To Monto)" is an Irish folk song, written in 1958 by George Desmond Hodnett, music critic of the Irish Times, and popularised by the Dubliners. Frank Harte was also known to sing the song.

Lyrics
Well, if you've got a wing-o, 
Take her up to Ring-o 
Where the waxies sing-o all the day; 
If you've had your fill of porter,
And you can't go any further 
Give your man the order: "Back to the Quay!"
And take her up to Monto, Monto, Monto 
Take her up to Monto, lan-ge-roo, 
To you! 
 
Have you heard of Buckshot Forster, 
The dirty old impostor 
Took a mot and lost her, up the Furry Glen. 
He first put on his bowler 
And buttoned up his trousers, 
Then whistled for a growler and he said, "My man!"
Take me up to Monto, Monto, Monto 
Take me up to Monto, lan-ge-roo, 
To you!
 
You've seen the Dublin Fusiliers, 
The dirty old bamboozeleers, 
De Wet'll kill them chiselers, one, two, three. 
Marching from the Linen Hall 
There's one for every cannonball, 
And Vicky's going to send them all, o'er the sea.
But first go up to Monto, Monto, Monto  
March them up to Monto, lan-ge-roo,  
To you! 
 
When Carey told on Skin-the-goat, 
O'Donnell caught him on the boat 
He wished he'd never been afloat, the dirty skite. 
It wasn't very sensible 
To tell on the Invincibles 
They stand up for their principles, day and night.
And you'll find them all in Monto, Monto, Monto 
Standing up in Monto, lan-ge-roo, To you!  
Now when the Tsar of Russia 
And the King of Prussia 
Landed in the Phoenix in a big balloon, 
They asked the police band 
To play "The Wearin' of the Green" 
But the buggers from the depot didn't know the tune.So they both went up to Monto, Monto, Monto  Scarpered up to Monto, lan-ge-roo, To you!  
The Queen she came to call on us, 
She wanted to see all of us 
I'm glad she didn't fall on us, she's eighteen stone. 
"Mister Me Lord Mayor," says she, 
"Is this all you've got to show me?" 
"Why, no ma'am there's some more to see, Póg mo thóin! " ('Kiss my arse!')And he took her up Monto, Monto, Monto  He set her up in Monto, lan-ge-roo,  For you!''

References

External links
Information on mudcat.org, retrieved July 27. 2016
Lyrics and chords of Monto with background information on the song

Songs about Ireland
Songs about prostitutes
Songs about queens
Songs about emperors
Songs about kings
Irish folk songs
Drinking songs
The Dubliners songs